The Javan bush warbler (Locustella montis) is a songbird species. Formerly placed in the "Old World warbler" assemblage, it is now placed in the newly recognized family Locustellidae.

It is found in the mountains of eastern Java.

References

Javan bush warbler
Birds of Java
Javan bush warbler